The Journal of Infrared, Millimeter, and Terahertz Waves is a monthly peer-reviewed scientific journal published by Springer Science+Business Media. The editor is Martin Koch (Philipps University of Marburg). Its publishing formats are letters and regular full papers. The journal was established in 1980 (with editor-in-chief Kenneth J. Button) as International Journal of Infrared and Millimeter Waves. The journal's first 29 volumes (1980–2008) were published under the old title; beginning with volume 30 (January 2009) the journal has been published under its current title.

Scope 
This journal focuses on original research pertaining to the 30 Gigahertz to 30 Terahertz frequency band of the electromagnetic spectrum. Sources, detectors, and other devices that operate in this frequency range are given topical coverage. Other subjects covered by this journal are systems, spectroscopy, applications, communications, sensing, metrology, and electromagnetic wave and matter interactions.

Abstracting and indexing
According to the Journal Citation Reports, the journal had a 2020 impact factor of 1.768. The journal is abstracted and indexed in:

References

External links 
 

Electrical and electronic engineering journals
Physics journals
English-language journals
Monthly journals
Publications established in 1980
Springer Science+Business Media academic journals